The National Fertilizer Corporation (colloquially known as NFC) is a Pakistani government owned corporation based in Lahore. It is under the administrative control of the Ministry of Industries and Production (Pakistan).

History
It was established by the Government of Pakistan in 1973 to start the fertilizer industry in Pakistan.

In 1999, Pak-American Fertilizers established a fertilizer facility in Daud Khel with funding from the Japan Bank for International Cooperation (JBIC). In 1997, operations ceased at the facility, and by 1999, commercial production at a new urea plant had begun.

Chairman
 Syed Babar Ali

Former subsidiaries
 Pak-China Fertilizers, Haripur
 Pak-Saudi Fertilizers, Mirpur Mathelo
 Pak-Arab Fertilizers, Multan
 Pak-American Fertilizers, Daudkhel
 Lyallpur Chemicals, Jaranwala
 Hazara Phosphate, Haripur

Research institutions established by NFC
For research purpose and to train workforce, it established two academic and one research institutes.

Academic institutes are:
 NFC Institute of Engineering and Technology, Multan
 NFC Institute of Engineering and Fertilizer Research, Faisalabad

and one research institute is:
 National Fertilizer Marketing Limited, Lahore

References

External links
Official website
Ministry of Industries & Production, Government of Pakistan

Fertilizer companies of Pakistan
Pakistani companies established in 1973
Chemical companies established in 1973
Government-owned companies of Pakistan
Companies based in Lahore